Chogolisa ( from Chogo Ling Sa; literally "Great Hunt") is a trapezoidal mountain in the Karakoram range in the Gilgit-Baltistan region of Pakistan. It lies near the Baltoro Glacier in the Concordia region, which is home to some of the highest peaks in the world.

In 1909, a party led by Duke of the Abruzzi reached  from a base camp located on the northern side and a high camp on the Chogolisa saddle at 6,335 m. Bad weather stopped the party from ascending further, but their climb established a new world altitude record.

Austrian mountaineers Hermann Buhl and Kurt Diemberger attempted Chogolisa in 1957 after they had successfully summitted Broad Peak behind Marcus Schmuck and Fritz Wintersteller a few weeks earlier. On June 25 they left camp I and camped in a saddle at 6,706 m on the southeast ridge. On June 27 a sudden snowstorm forced them to retreat and, on the descent, Buhl broke off a big cornice and fell into the mountain's near vertical north face. His body has never been found.

On August 4, 1958, a Japanese expedition from the Academic Alpine Club Kyoto University led by Takeo Kuwabara (桑原武夫) made the first ascent of Chogolisa II, placing Masao Fujihira and Kazumasa Hirai on top.  

The first ascent of Chogolisa I was made on August 2, 1975, by Fred Pressl and Gustav Ammerer of an Austrian expedition led by Eduard Koblmueller. Koblmueller almost suffered the same fate as Buhl, as he also fell through a snow cornice on the ascent, but he was roped and team members were able to pull him to safety.

See also
 List of mountains in Pakistan
 List of highest mountains
 List of Ultras of the Karakoram and Hindu Kush

References

External links
Chogolisa on Peakware
Chogolisa das Grab Hermann Buhls auf BroadPeak.at (German Language)
Northern Pakistan detailed placemarks in Google Earth

Mountains of Gilgit-Baltistan
Seven-thousanders of the Karakoram